The 2019 Serbia FIBA Basketball World Cup team represented Serbia at the 2019 FIBA Basketball World Cup in China. Serbia finished the tournament in fifth place with a 6–2 record and qualified for the Olympic Qualifying Tournament.

Serbia qualified for the World Cup by taking the 3rd place in the European Second Round Group L. The team was coached by Aleksandar Đorđević, with assistant coaches Jovica Antonić, Darko Rajaković, and Miroslav Nikolić. The Serbian team won the silver medal at the previous World Cup. 

This was the 3rd appearance of Serbia at the FIBA Basketball World Cup; however, FIBA considers Serbia as the successor team of FR Yugoslavia and Serbia and Montenegro who themselves qualified on three occasions. Serbia's best result is 2nd place in 2014; however, FIBA considers Serbia as the successor team of FR Yugoslavia who won 2 World Cups (1998, 2002).

At the end of the tournament, head coach Đorđević announced his decision to leave the position after six years. For his performances, guard Bogdan Bogdanović was selected to the FIBA Basketball World Cup All-Tournament Team. With 183 points scored throughout the tournament, guard Bogdanović was the FIBA Basketball World Cup Top Scorer by total points scored.

Timeline 
7 June: 34-man roster announced
1 July: 18-man roster announced
18 July: The players gathering in Belgrade
21 July: Start of a training camp at Kopaonik
4 August: The end of the training camp
4 August – 27 August: Exhibition games
20 August: Departure of the team to China
31 August – 15 September: 2019 FIBA Basketball World Cup

Qualification 

First round

Second round

Roster

On 24 May 2019, center Nikola Jokić, who earned All-NBA First Team honors, has confirmed that he will play at the World Cup. All players who won a silver medal at the 2017 EuroBasket in four European countries were included on the 34-man roster besides center Vladimir Štimac who announced his retirement from international basketball after Eurobasket at 29. Guard Branko Lazić is the only member of the 2017 Serbia roster who wasn't listed at the 18-man preliminary roster. Centers Jokić and Ognjen Kuzmić, and guard Marko Gudurić are members of the 18-man preliminary roster who didn't play a single game in the World Cup qualifications. On 1 July, the EuroLeague guard Nemanja Nedović expressed his disappointment on his cut from the 18-man preliminary roster. On 14 July, Kuzmić was involved in a serious traffic accident near Banja Luka, Bosnia and Herzegovina, in which he got life-threatening injuries. On 15 July, Kuzmić was put out from the roster due to the unpredictability of the recovery time for such injuries, so coach Aleksandar Đorđević invited center Nikola Jovanović as his substitute. On 8 August, coach Đorđević announced the preliminary 14-man roster. On 10 August, the team captain Miloš Teodosić suffered a plantar fascia injury in his left foot in the game against Lithuania and will remain in the roster until new results are known after a recovery therapy. Forward Vladimir Lučić and guard Teodosić skipped the Acropolis Tournament due to injuries. On 16 August, guard Dragan Milosavljević suffered an anterior cruciate ligament injury in his left knee in the game against Turkey. On the next day, it was announced that guard Milosavljević would not be able to play at the World Cup due to the injury. On 20 August, coach Đorđević confirmed that a guard and team captain Teodosić won't play at the World Cup, due to the injury. Center Miroslav Raduljica was selected as a new team captain due to Teodosić's inability to play on the tournament. On 29 August, coach Đorđević officially announced the final roster.

The members of Serbia roster at the EuroBasket 2017 guards Stefan Jović, Vasilije Micić, Bogdan Bogdanović, Gudurić, forwards Stefan Birčević, Lučić and center Boban Marjanović are coming back to the World Cup roster. Forward Marko Simonović and centers Raduljica and Jokić make the first appearance at a major tournament since the 2016 Summer Olympics, while forward Nemanja Bjelica and center Nikola Milutinov previously played at the EuroBasket 2015. The 2019 World Cup marked the first time since EuroBasket 2011 that the Serbia national team roster didn't contain any players from the Basketball League of Serbia (KLS).

The average age was 28 years old.

The following is the Serbia roster for the World Cup.

The following were candidates to make the team:

Notes

Depth chart

Staff 
On 18 July, Darko Rajaković was hired as an assistant coach, joining the staff as a replacement for Milan Minić. On 20 August, physiotherapist Marko Sokić returned to the staff.

Age – describes age on 31 August 2019

Source: KSS

Uniform

Supplier: Peak
Main sponsor: Ganten
Back sponsor: Triglav (below number)
Shorts sponsor: mts

Exhibition games
The Serbia roster played ten exhibition games and went undefeated at 10–0. They began its exhibition schedule with three domestic games and went undefeated. The game with Lithuania in Belgrade had charity cause. The Basketball Federation of Serbia donated a percentage of the ticket sale revenue to a UNICEF project in Serbia. On 13 August, it's announced that 5.374 million Serbian dinars have to be donated to the UNICEF project. Serbia played at the 2019 Acropolis of Athens Tournament together with Greece, Italy, and Turkey from 16–18 August. The Serbia roster went undefeated at 3–0 in Athens and won the Acropolis Tournament. Last games was held from 23–27 August at the 2019 Austiger Cup in Shenyang where they faced France, Italy, and New Zealand. Also, the Serbia roster went undefeated and won the Austiger Cup.

Acropolis Cup

AusTiger Cup

Tournament 

The 2019 FIBA Basketball World Cup is the 18th tournament of the FIBA Basketball World Cup championship that is organized by FIBA.

Preliminary round 

Serbia was drawn into Group D with Angola, Italy, and the Philippines and played all of its group phase matches in Foshan at the Foshan International Sports and Cultural Center from 31 August to 4 September. 

All times are local UTC+8.

Angola 
This was the second game between Angola and Serbia in the World Cup. The Serbians won the first meeting in 2010. The Serbians won in the 2016 FIBA World Olympic Qualifying Tournament, the last competitive game between the two teams. 

Forward Nemanja Bjelica missed the game due to a knee injury. Center Miroslav Raduljica made his 100th appearance for the national team.

TCL Player of the Game: Bogdan Bogdanović

Philippines 
This was the first competitive game between Serbia and the Philippines. 

Serbia had a slow start to the game and the Philippines tried to grow in the confidence. Tied at 7-all with six minutes left in the opening quarter, center Nikola Jokić came off the bench and the Serbian offense started to roll. The Serbs used a 7–0 run to close the first 10 minutes with a 25–13 lead. Forward Nemanja Bjelica came off the bench making all 7 of his field-goal attempts, including 3 three-pointers to finish with a game-high 20 points in just 16 minutes of action. Serbia not only out-rebounded Philippines 37–23, but they finished with 37 assists against Philippines' 14.

This is the game won by largest points margin at 59 for the Serbians at any of major tournaments since 2006. With 37 team assists Serbia set the World Cup record for the most assists in a single game.

TCL Player of the Game: Nemanja Bjelica

Italy 
This was the first game between Italy and Serbia in the World Cup. Serbia won in its last competitive game against Italy, in EuroBasket 2017.

The game with Italy kicked off pretty tie, and after a 3-pointer from Bogdan Bogdanović in the 3rd minute, the score tied the game at 8-all. After the third straight 3-pointer from Bogdanović in the 5th minute, the score was 13–10. In the 7th minute, after a 3-pointer from Stefan Jović and points from Nikola Jokić, the score was 20–14. After Boban Marjanović scored 2 free throws and got the lead up to 7 with a minute left in the first quarter, 26–19. The first quarter ended with Serbia's 28–23 lead. In the second quarter, the Serbians played better and controlled the game, while the Italians kept up with 3-pointers. After two good plays and a 3-pointers by Jović and Bogdanović, Serbia led 39–29 in the 14th minute. Thereafter, the Italians had the 5–0 run. After a layup by Vasilije Micić, with 3 minutes remaining in the first half, the lead was back up to 10 points for Serbia, 48–38. At the half time, Serbia led 50–42. At the start of the third quarter, the Italians have caught up with a series of 3-pointers and cut the lead down to 55–53 for Serbia. With a good defense, the Serbians held up them from getting the lead. So the Serbians lead was going up and down from 2 to 6 points. In those moments, Miroslav Raduljica got fouled three times in a row and Bogdanović right after, so the Serbians got the lead back up to 10 point from a free throw line at 64–54. Nemanja Bjelica scored for the 13 points lead at 70–57 by the end of the third quarter. At the beginning of the last quarter, Italy had a 5–0 run and got back into the game, before Bogdanović made a 3-pointer and Raduljica scored from a free throw resisted the comeback at 76–62. Thereafter, Bogdanović had a steal and scored for 15 points lead at 80–65 within 6 minutes remaining. A minute later Bjelica made a 3-pointer, then Bogdanović had another steal and passed it to Vladimir Lučić who scored for the 85–67 Serbian lead at 4:30 minutes remaining. Bogdanović made another 3-pointer and got the lead up to 23 points at 90:67. Bogdanović scored a career-high 31 points and led all Serbs with 36 minutes played as Serbia won 92–77 over Italy.

TCL Player of the Game: Bogdan Bogdanović

Second round 

Serbia finished as the group winner in its preliminary group and advanced to the second round of the FIBA Basketball World Cup. It played against two top finishers of Group C, Spain and Puerto Rico, in Wuhan at the Wuhan Gymnasium from 6–8 September. Serbia finished as the runner-up in its second-round group and advance to the quarter-finals.

All times are local UTC+8.

Puerto Rico
This was the first game between Puerto Rico and Serbia in the World Cup. Serbia won in its last competitive game against Puerto Rico, in the 2016 FIBA World Olympic Qualifying Tournament. 

Nemanja Bjelica led all scorers with 18 points off the bench, Nikola Jokić contributed 14 points and 10 rebounds, Boban Marjanović impressed 16 points, while David Huertas - the only Puerto Rican to score in double digits - finished with 11 points.

 TCL Player of the Game: Boban Marjanović

Spain
This was the third match between Spain and Serbia in the World Cup, with both teams winning once in previous matches. Serbia won in its last competitive game against Spain, in EuroBasket 2015 group stage.

Center Nikola Jokić was ejected after two successive technical fouls with 6:40 minutes left in the third quarter. Guard Ricky Rubio paced Spain with an individual World Cup high 19 points while Victor Claver chipped in 14 points, 7 rebounds, 3 steals and 2 blocks and Marc Gasol picked up 11 points, 6 rebounds and 6 assists after just 2 points in his last game as Spain remained perfect at 5–0. Serbia came into the game having averaged 103.3 points and holding their opponents to just 62.5 points. But Spain also had averaged just 62.5 points allowed and Serbia could not solve the Spaniards despite Bogdan Bogdanović scoring a game-high 26 points to go with 10 rebounds and 6 assists.

 TCL Player of the Game: Ricky Rubio (Spain)

Final round 

All times are local UTC+8.

Quarter-finals 
This was the second game between Argentina and Serbia in the World Cup. The Serbians won the first meeting in 2010. 

Argentina were up for most of the game, but it was their response when Serbia took the lead at the start of the fourth that was impressive. Back-to-back and-one plays by Nicolás Laprovíttola and Luis Scola made it an 87–76 game with just over three minutes to play. That seemed to break Serbian spirits, there was no comeback by the team that had Nikola Jokić, Bogdan Bogdanović, Boban Marjanović and all the other stars here. Facundo Campazzo had 18 points, 12 assists, 6 rebounds and 3 steals, becoming the first man with 15+ points, 10+ assists, 5+ rebounds and 3+ steals since Croatia's Toni Kukoč, who did it against Canada in 1994.

 TCL Player of the Game: Facundo Campazzo (Argentina)

Classification semi-finals 
This was the second game between Serbia and the United States in the World Cup. The Americans won the 2014 FIBA Basketball World Cup Final. Also, the Americans won in the 2016 Summer Olympics Final, the last competitive game between the two teams. 

Serbia shot the lights out in the first period in Dongguan, connecting eight times from beyond the arc for a 32–7 lead heading into the second quarter. The Americans found their groove, though, dominated the second stanza and trailed by just four points at the half. Serbia led by just three points at the beginning of the final period, but behind Vladimir Lučić, Vasilije Micić and Boban Marjanović, they erected a 13-point lead with just 4:43 left. Team USA would still try to make a late comeback, trimming the lead to as little as four points, but it was all for nothing as the Serbians proved steadier down the stretch. It remained nip-and-tuck for much of the second half before the Serbians rebuilt their double-digit lead in the fourth period and successfully kept the Americans at bay. Bogdan Bogdanović and Lučić combined for 43 points to lead Serbia, while Harrison Barnes had 22 for the United States.

 TCL Player of the Game: Bogdan Bogdanović

Fifth place match
This was the first game between the Czech Republic and Serbia in the World Cup. Serbia won in its last competitive game against the Czech Republic, in the 2016 FIBA World Olympic Qualifying Tournament. 

Behind a stingy defense and terrific perimeter shooting, Czech Republic erected a 50–41 lead at the half, but the Serbians got their act together in the last two periods to register their sixth win. Bogdan Bogdanović had the hot hand for Serbia with 31 points, and he was assisted well by Nikola Milutinov, who had 14. The Czechs, meanwhile, drew 16 points from Patrik Auda. Staring at a nine-point half-time deficit was not in Serbia's plans, but they rose to the occasion and turned the tables on the Czech Republic in the third quarter. The Serbians outscored their foes, 28–12, in that span to retake the lead for good.

 TCL Player of the Game: Bogdan Bogdanović

Awards 
TCL Player of the Game

All-Tournament Team
 Bogdan Bogdanović

Tournament Top Scorer (By total points scored)
 Bogdan Bogdanović (183 points)

Statistics

Player statistics

Statistical leaders
Last updated:

Individual game highs 

 1– at least 5 attempts

Team game highs 

Source

Aftermath 
The Serbia roster ended their 2019 FIBA Basketball World Cup campaign with a 6–2 record, finishing fifth. Serbia didn't manage to clinch the outright European berth for the 2020 Summer Olympics by failing to finish among two highest performing teams from FIBA Europe; Spain and France qualified instead. The only route for Serbia to qualify for the Summer Olympics is to won one of the Olympic qualifying tournaments.

At the end of the tournament, head coach Đorđević announced his decision to leave the position after six years. On 20 November, the Basketball Federation of Serbia named Igor Kokoškov the new head coach of the Serbia team.

See also 
 2019 Philippines FIBA Basketball World Cup team
 2019 Italy FIBA Basketball World Cup team
 2019 United States FIBA Basketball World Cup team

References

External links

2019 FIBA Basketball World Cup Profile at FIBA Website

-
2019